Ambrogio Raffaele or Raffele (1845-1928) was an Italian painter.

He was born in Vigevano. He studied under Antonio Fontanesi and Andrea Gastaldi at the Accademia Albertina in Turin, and was a colleague of Marco Calderini. He moved back to Vigevano late in life. He painted both genre and landscapes, in oil and water-color. In 1880 at Turin, he exhibited: Bacia, sole immortale, bacia il tuo figlio. At Milan, in 1881, he had a landscape depicting Un tramonto di sole, and at Rome, in 1833, Lettrice distratta. Among his other works were La finestra dirimpetto; Piazza Pia a Roma; Al Colosseo; and Sera; Rome fuori Porta San Paolo and Passeggiata in montagna were watercolors displayed at the 1887 Exhibition in Venice. Singer Sargent painted a portrait of the artist with his painter's kit and chair, sitting atop a hillside in front of an alpine landscape. This underscores Raffaele's technique to paint his landscapes outdoors.

References

1845 births
1928 deaths
Painters from Piedmont
19th-century Italian painters
Italian male painters
20th-century Italian painters
Italian genre painters
Italian landscape painters
Accademia Albertina alumni
19th-century Italian male artists
20th-century Italian male artists